The Vision of Delight was a Jacobean era masque written by Ben Jonson. It was most likely performed on Twelfth Night, 6 January 1617 in the Banqueting House at Whitehall Palace, and repeated on 19 January that year.

The Vision of Delight was first published in the second folio collection of Jonson's works in 1641.

Design
The scholarly consensus favors the view that the masque was designed by Inigo Jones, though no firm historical evidence necessitates this conclusion, and data on the masque's design elements are not extant.

The masque's music, composed by Nicholas Lanier, has unfortunately not survived, except for a setting for the final song.

Pocahontas
The masque's first performance was attended by the Native Americans Pocahontas and Tomocomo, two months before Pocahontas's untimely death. Lady Anne Clifford, Lady Ruthin, the Countess of Pembroke and the Countess of Arundel watched the masque together from a box.

Buckingham
The masque was connected with George Villiers, 1st Duke of Buckingham, the favorite of King James I. The Vision of Delight was performed on the day Villiers received his title as Earl (later Duke) of Buckingham. Buckingham had sponsored Jonson's masque  The Gypsies Metamorphosed (1621); he had also danced in Pleasure Reconciled to Virtue (1618).

The show
The Vision of Delight has been regarded as almost a prototypical or quintessential example of the masque; it features the mythological figures and personifications of abstractions that are standard for the form. The work opens with personifications of Delight, Harmony, Grace, Love, Laughter, Revel, Sport, and Wonder; they are later joined by the ancient Greek deities Zephyrus and Aurora. Jonson's verse, heralding the coming of Spring, is lush and vibrant; the nineteenth-century critic and editor William Gifford called the masque "one of the most beautiful of Jonson's little pieces, light, airy, harmonious, and poetical in no common degree. It stands without parallel among performances of this kind...." Two anti-masques feature comical figures of "pantaloons" and "phantasms," followed by the more serious portion of the work in which the aristocratic masquers descend from a Bower of Spring to dance their dances. The effect is one of "glowing idealism."

Orazio Busino, chaplain of the Venetian ambassador Piero Contarini, gave a description of the jewels and costume of aristocratic women and ladies in waiting in the audience;every box was filled notably with most noble and richly arrayed ladies, in number some 600 and more according to the general estimate ; the dresses being of such variety in cut and colour as to be indescribable; the most delicate plumes over their heads, springing from their foreheads or in their hands serving as fans ; strings of jewels on their necks and bosoms and in their girdles and apparel in such quantity that they looked like so many queens, so that at the beginning, with but little light, such as that of the dawn or of the evening twilight, the splendour of their diamonds and other jewels was so brilliant that they looked like so many stars ... The dress peculiar to these ladies is very handsome ... behind it hangs wellnigh from the neck down to the ground, with long, close sleeves and waist ... The farthingale also plays its part. The plump and buxom display their bosoms very liberally, and those who are lean go muffled up to the throat. All wear men's shoes or at least very low slippers. They consider the mask as indispensable for their face as bread at table, but they lay it aside willingly at these public entertainments".

One passage in Jonson's text has been cited by critics as influencing John Milton's poem Il Penseroso.

Sources
Despite its evanescent surface appearance (one commentator has called the work "a masque about masques"), Jonson's text is not without intellectual weight; Jonson based his masque on traditional dream theory, relying most likely on the Commentarii in Somnium Scipionis, Macrobius's study of the Dream of Scipio by Cicero. Jonson treats the audience of the performance as an assemblage of dreamers, and through his masque illustrates Macrobius's categories of dreams.

References

Masques by Ben Jonson
English Renaissance plays
1617 plays